Acmaeodera mariposa is a species of metallic wood-boring beetle in the family Buprestidae. It is found in North America.

Subspecies
These two subspecies belong to the species Acmaeodera mariposa:
 Acmaeodera mariposa dohrni Horn, 1878
 Acmaeodera mariposa mariposa Horn, 1878

References

Further reading

 
 
 

mariposa
Articles created by Qbugbot
Beetles described in 1878